Evides is a genus of beetles in the family Buprestidae, containing the following species:

 Evides aenea Kerremans, 1898
 Evides elegans (Fabricius, 1781)
 Evides fairmairei Kerremans, 1908
 Evides gambiensis (Laporte & Gory, 1835)
 Evides intermedia Saunders, 1874
 Evides interstitialis Obenberger, 1924
 Evides kerremansi Fairmaire, 1891
 Evides kraatzi Kerremans, 1899
 Evides opaca (Lansbarge, 1886)
 Evides pubiventris (Laporte & Gory, 1835)
 Evides triangularis Thomson, 1878

References

Buprestidae genera